Anne Sackville may refer to:

Lady Anne Clifford (1590–1676), married name Anne Sackville, wife of the 3rd Earl of Cumberland
Anne Fiennes (died 1595), née Anne Sackville, daughter of Sir Richard Sackville
Anne Sackville, Countess of Dorset (died 1618)